A deferral, in accrual accounting, is any account where the income or expense is not recognised until a future date (accounting period), e.g. annuities, charges, taxes, income, etc. The deferred item may be carried, dependent on type of deferral, as either an asset or liability. See also accrual.

Deferrals are the consequence of the revenue recognition principle which dictates that revenues be recognized in the period in which they occur, and the matching principle which dictates expenses to be recognized in the period in which they are incurred. Deferrals are the result of cash flows occurring before they are allowed to be recognized under accrual accounting. As a result, adjusting entries are required to reconcile a flow of cash (or rarely other non-cash items) with events that have not occurred yet as either liabilities or assets. Because of the similarity between deferrals and their corresponding accruals, they are commonly conflated.

 Deferred expense: cash has left the company, but the event has not actually occurred yet. Prepaid expenses are the most common type. For instance, a company may purchase a year of insurance. After six months, only half of the insurance will have been 'used' with another six months of the insurance still owed to the company. Thus, the company records half of the payment as an outflow (an expense) and the other half as a receivable from the insurance company (an asset).
 Deferred revenue: Revenue has come into the company, but the event has still not occurred – it is unearned revenue. A magazine company, for instance, may receive money for a one-year subscription. However, the company has not spent the resources in producing and delivering those magazines and thus accountants record this revenue as a liability equal to the amount of cash received. The magazine company, while now having more cash on hand, also now owes a year of magazines. The amount of each magazine that gets delivered is then taken out of liabilities and recorded as revenue during the economic period in which it actually happens, not just when the company gets paid for it.

Deferral (deferred charge)
Deferred charge (or deferral) is cost that is accounted-for in latter accounting period for its anticipated future benefit, or to comply with the requirement of matching costs with revenues. Deferred charges include costs of starting up, obtaining long-term debt, advertising campaigns, etc., and are carried as a non-current asset on the balance sheet pending amortization. 
Deferred charges often extend over five years or more and occur infrequently unlike prepaid expenses, e.g. insurance, interest, rent. Financial ratios are based on the total assets excluding deferred charges since they have no physical substance (cash realization) and cannot be used in reducing total liabilities.

Deferred expense
A Deferred expense or prepayment, prepaid expense, plural often prepaids, is an asset representing cash paid out to a counterpart for goods or services to be received in a later accounting period.  For example, if a service contract is paid quarterly in advance, at the end of the first month of the period two months remain as a deferred expense.  In the deferred expense the early payment is accompanied by a related recognized expense in the subsequent accounting period, and the same amount is deducted from the prepayment. The deferred expense shares characteristics with accrued revenue (or accrued assets) with the difference that an asset to be covered later are proceeds from a delivery of goods or services, at which such income item is earned and the related revenue item is recognized, while cash for them is to be received in a later period, when its amount is deducted from accrued revenues.

For example, when the accounting periods are monthly, an 11/12 portion of an annually paid insurance cost is added to prepaid expenses, which are decreased by 1/12 of the cost in each subsequent period when the same fraction is recognized as an expense, rather than all in the month in which such cost is billed. The not-yet-recognized portion of such costs remains as prepayments (assets) to prevent such cost from turning into a fictitious loss in the monthly period it is billed, and into a fictitious profit in any other monthly period.

Similarly, cash paid out for (the cost of) goods and services not received by the end of the accounting period is added to the prepayments to prevent it from turning into a fictitious loss in the period cash was paid out, and into a fictitious profit in the period of their reception. Such cost is not recognized in the income statement (profit and loss or P&L) as the expense incurred in the period of payment, but in the period of their reception when such costs are recognized as expenses in P&L and deducted from prepayments (assets) on balance sheets.

Deferred revenue
Deferred revenue (or deferred income) is a liability, such as cash received from a counterpart for goods or services that are to be delivered in a later accounting period. When such income item is earned, the related revenue item is recognized, and the deferred revenue is reduced. It shares characteristics with accrued expense with the difference that a liability to be covered later is an obligation to pay for goods or services received from a counterpart, while cash for them is to be paid out in a later period when its amount is deducted from accrued expenses.

For example, a company receives an annual software license fee paid out by a customer upfront on the January 1. However, the company's fiscal year ends on May 31. So, the company using accrual accounting adds only five months' worth (5/12) of the fee to its revenues in profit and loss for the fiscal year the fee was received. The rest is added to deferred income (liability) on the balance sheet for that year.

See also

 Deferred tax
 Revenue recognition
 Matching principle
 Accruals in accounting

References 

Corporate taxation

de:Rechnungsabgrenzung